The Philippine Senate Committee on National Defense and Security, Peace, Unification and Reconciliation is a standing committee of the Senate of the Philippines.

This committee was formed after the Committee on National Defense and Security and the Committee on Peace, Unification and Reconciliation were merged on September 3, 2019, pursuant to Senate Resolution No. 9 of the 18th Congress.

Jurisdiction 
According to the Rules of the Senate, the committee handles all matters relating to:

 National defense and external and internal threats to national security
 Peace, internal armed conflict resolution, political negotiation, cessation of hostilities, amnesty, rebel returnees, integration and development, national unification and reconciliation
 The Department of National Defense
 Armed Forces of the Philippines
 The Philippine Coast Guard
 The National Security Council
 The Office of the Presidential Adviser on Peace, Reconciliation and Unity
 The Office of the Presidential Adviser on Military Affairs 
 Pension plans and fringe benefits of war veterans and military retirees
 Citizens army selective service
 Forts
 Arsenals
 Military camps and reservations
 Coast, geodetic and meteorological surveys
 Civil defense
 Military research and development

Members, 18th Congress 
Based on the Rules of the Senate, the Senate Committee on National Defense and Security, Peace, Unification and Reconciliation has 19 members.

The President Pro Tempore, the Majority Floor Leader, and the Minority Floor Leader are ex officio members.

Here are the members of the committee in the 18th Congress as of September 24, 2020:

Committee secretary: Charlyne Claire Fuentes-Olay

See also 

 List of Philippine Senate committees

References 

National
Parliamentary committees on Defence
Military of the Philippines